Veliky Oktyabr is a rural locality (a settlement) in Kuybyshevskoye Rural Settlement, Sredneakhtubinsky District, Volgograd Oblast, Russia. The population was 550 as of 2010. There are 13 streets.

Geography 
Veliky Oktyabr is located 15 km southwest of Srednyaya Akhtuba (the district's administrative centre) by road. Vyazovka is the nearest rural locality.

References 

Rural localities in Sredneakhtubinsky District